The Vincentian records in swimming are the fastest ever performances of swimmers from Saint Vincent and the Grenadines, which are recognised and ratified by the Saint Vincent and the Grenadines Amateur Swimming Association (SVGASA).

All records were set in finals unless noted otherwise.

Long Course (50 m)

Men

Women

Short Course (25 m)

Men

Women

References
General
Vincentian Long Course Records – Men 16 February 2018 updated
Vincentian Long Course Records – Women 16 February 2018 updated
Vincentian Short Course Records – Men 16 February 2018 updated
Vincentian Short Course Records – Women 16 February 2018 updated
Specific

External links
SVGASA web site

Swimming
Swimming in Saint Vincent and the Grenadines
Vincentian
Swimming